Milpitas High School (MHS) is a public four-year comprehensive high school in Milpitas, California, a suburban community north of San Jose. It is one of two high schools within the Milpitas Unified School District.

As of 2013, Milpitas High School had an API score of 830 and had an API ranking of 8 out of 10. In 2004, MHS was granted a full, six-year accreditation by the Western Association of Schools and Colleges.

The school provides its students with many academic, extracurricular and other resources in a community committed to diversity in its student body, faculty and staff. Milpitas High School has modernized facilities which are spread across a 44-acre campus. The facilities include an 8 lane track, tennis courts, baseball field, soccer field, and large gymnasium.

History

Milpitas High School was directly preceded by Samuel Ayer High School. A continuum of education had existed in what is now the City of Milpitas since the Spanish colonial era, only to be interrupted by brief periods from 1848-1858 upon the secularization of the Californian missions, and 1954–1959, in which James Lick High School in the nearby city of San Jose became the high school for Milpitas residents. Upon the final restoration of local secondary education in 1959, a classical education in Latin Grammar and English Literature ceased to be the norm, and a modern curriculum was implemented, of which forms the basis of the curriculum for the present high school. Milpitas High School co-existed with Samuel Ayer High School from 1969, until the latter closed its doors in 1980, leaving Milpitas High School to be the sole remaining high school.
The predecessors of Milpitas High School are:
Mission San José de Guadalupe (1797–1848)
First interruption period, 1848-1856
Laguna School (1856–1858)
Milpitas Grammar School (1858–1954)
Second interruption period, 1954-1959
James Lick High School (1954–1959)
Restoration to Milpitas
Samuel Ayer High School (1959–1969; co-existed until 1980)

Campus
Milpitas High School is located on Escuela Parkway in Milpitas, north of Jacklin Road. The eastern side of the school is the main entrance and student drop-off area, and the western side consists of a football stadium, track, and mural of Milpitas High School's mascot, the Trojans.

Milpitas High School has many facilities for athletic use. The school has a new swimming pool (as of 2015) that is open to the public. Also, the football and soccer fields are built of artificial turf, and the synthetic rubber track was built in 2003 and finished in 2004. Since its beginnings, Milpitas High has been renovated and improved, with new buildings and facilities being added for school use. Marshall Pomeroy Elementary School is adjacent to Milpitas High School's east side, and Thomas Russell Middle School is located northeast of the high school.

Academics

Departments
ELD-PFEL
Fine Arts
Foreign Language
Home Economics
Industrial Technology
Language Arts
Mathematics
NJROTC
Performing Arts
Physical Education
Science
Social Studies
Special Education
CCOC/ROP

Advanced Placement (AP) Honor Roll
Milpitas Unified School District is one of 22 districts in the state that has been recognized by the College Board for simultaneously achieving increases in access to AP courses for a broader number of students and improving the rate at which AP students have earned scores of 3 or higher on an AP exam. The pass rate is 76%, higher than CA as a whole and higher than the international pass rate. Milpitas High School is on the 3rd Annual Honor Roll.

Committees
There are two committees to enrich development at Milpitas School:
Parent-Teacher-Student Association (PTSA)
School Site Council

Graduation requirements
Students must complete 220 credits, including:
English- 40 credits
Social Studies- 35 credits
Math- 30 credits
Science- 20 credits
Physical Education- 20 credits
Fine Arts, Foreign Language, or Humanities- 10 credits
Electives- 65 credits

Milpitas Unified requires 20 hours of community service in order to receive a high school diploma.

Extracurricular activities

Athletics

In 1997 the Boys Varsity Basketball team won the first CCS Division 1 Championship in school history by defeating Oak Grove 44-43. Led by Steve Moore's 19 points.

On December 2, 2006, the Milpitas High School Varsity football team won the CCS Championship for the first time. The Trojans competed against rival Piedmont Hills High School and won, 39-21. This was the second time Milpitas High School made it to the CCS Championship game. The first time was in 1993, and the Trojans lost to Leland High School in a shutout scenario of 35-0. Milpitas won CCS again in 2009. 4 years later, Milpitas won the school's third CCS championship; beating San Benito High School 37-23. In 2017 Milpitas won the school's first state championship in any sport; beating Southwest High School from El Centro 45-41.

The 2008 football season was a successful one for the trojans becoming the De Anza division league champions with a record of 9 and 1.

In 2007, Milpitas High School's varsity girls track & field claimed 3rd place in the overall team title.

In 2004, varsity girls cross country won the team CCS title and qualified for state championships.

In 2015, Milpitas High School's varsity baseball team made school history, reaching the semi-finals in the Central Coast Section Division I Playoffs at San Jose Municipal Stadium where they lost a tight game in 10 innings to Piedmont Hills High School, the eventual champions. The Trojans season was highlighted by 7 walk-off wins during the season and highlighted by numerous upsets throughout the season. These upsets included victories over Carlmont for the Michael DeJesus Tournament, Pioneer High School, the 2014 CCS Open Division Champion Leland High School, a walk-off over a highly favored Los Gatos team at home, Los Altos, Saratoga, Homestead (twice: once during regular season play, and the other in the De Anza League Tourney to secure a fifth place league finish) 4 close victories over Mountain View High School, and a shocking upset over the favored 5-seed Willow Glen High School in the 1st round of the playoffs. These Trojans were one of the few Cinderella story teams that shocked CCS baseball with their outstanding run to the semi-finals.

CLOGS
Unique to campus lexicon is the word "clogs", which means "clubs and organizations".
Clogs host weekly meetings in classroom on campus during lunch throughout the school year. All clogs must be chartered every year through A.S.B, and approved at monthly congress meetings.

Some popular "CLOGS" include:

 Astronomy Club
 Environmental Society
 DECA
 Computer Science Club
 Dragonboat Club
 Tech Society
 Math Club
 French Club
 Speech and Debate
 National Honor Society
 Chess Club
 Stock Market Club
 Interact
 Key Club
 Board Game Club
 FBLA
 AIM Club
 Ecoway
 Esports
 Tetris Club
 Chinese Club
 Dungeons & Dragons Club
 Dragon Flower Union
 Mock Trial

The Music Department
The department has a 100+ member marching band, a Pep Band, a 60 piece symphony orchestra, two concert bands, percussion ensembles, and a jazz band. The band is led by Emily Moore and Moises Fagundes.

Marching Band & Color Guard/Concert Band
The MHS Marching Band and Color Guard regularly compete in WBA (Western Band Association) field show competitions. The marching band and pep band also regularly perform at home varsity football games.

In 2019, The marching band qualified for finals at the WBA 4A/5A Grand Championships for the first time in school history.
In 2021, The marching band got 2nd place in the 4A Division at the James Logan Invitational Band Tournament- WBA Regional Championships with a score of 84.50.
In 2022, The marching band qualified for finals at the WBA 4A/5A Grand Championships once again.

At the conclusion of the marching band season each December, the members form separate concert bands; a Wind Ensemble, a Wind Symphony, a Symphonic Winds, and a Symphonic Band.

Jazz Band
Milpitas High School has a standard 17-piece Jazz Band that meets every morning during zero period, from 7-8 AM In April 2005, the Milpitas High School Jazz Band received a Command Performance Rating at the 2005 Santa Cruz Jazz Festival and again in 2013.

Orchestra
Since 2002, the MHS Symphony Orchestra has provided an opportunity for string musicians to perform a variety of classical and contemporary orchestral literature.

Vocal Ensembles
The MHS Glee Club was formed during the 2009 school year. The concert choir was revived in 2002 after being canceled in the mid-1990s, and again in the 2008 school year.

Navy Junior ROTC
A few students at Milpitas High School belong to the Navy Junior ROTC program. Students enrolled in the program have the opportunity to become a part of one of three drill teams. These drill teams are Drill Team With Arms, Unarmed Drill Team, and Color Guard. Each year, Milpitas NJROTC hosts "Legions of Troy", a drill meet and athletic competition that many other Californian JROTC units attend. Weekly lesson plans includes academic instruction, uniform inspection, physical training, and drill.

The Union
The Union is the student-run campus newspaper, produced every six weeks by the Journalism class. Students take on roles in the class as reporters, photographers, and editors in the making of the publication. The Union includes sections for news, editorial, opinion, features, fashion, sports, and lifestyle. The student newspaper is predominantly funded by advertisements from local businesses. Students in the class use Adobe InDesign on the computers provided in the classroom to design page layouts for each new issue. Pages are put together by the editors of each section and overseen by the editor-in-chief.

Science Olympiad
The Milpitas High School's Science Olympiad is a student-run and staff-supported organization that started in 2007 with only a few students. They now have more than 100 members each year. The Milpitas High School Science Olympiad's top team has qualified for States six times in total, placing in the top ten almost every time. They also provide outreach to the two middle school teams in the Milpitas school district, the Rancho and Thomas Russell Middle Schools.

Notable alumni
Kim Bokamper – Miami Dolphins football player; 1976 NFL First round pick
Brandon Carswell – former USC football player
Lenzie Jackson – NFL football player
Alex Lee, member of the California State Assembly
Deltha O'Neal – NFL football player; 2000 NFL First round pick
Tab Perry – NFL football player; 2005 NFL Sixth round pick
Vita Vea – NFL football player for the Tampa Bay Buccaneers; 2018 NFL First round pick; Super Bowl Champion 2020
Jeannie Mai – TV personality
Sarina Bolden – Philippine Women's National Football Team Forward

References

External links

Official website
Milpitas Unified School District website
Milpitas High Music Department website
Milpitas High School Science Olympiad website

Educational institutions established in 1969
Schools accredited by the Western Association of Schools and Colleges
High schools in Santa Clara County, California
Buildings and structures in Milpitas, California
1969 establishments in California